

Golzerensee (some times Golzernsee) is a lake at Golzeren (also Golzern) in the Canton of Uri, Switzerland. Golzeren is located in the Maderanertal and can be reached by cable car from Bristen (municipality of Silenen). The lake is a popular fishing location. Species include brown trout, rainbow trout, and perch.

See also
List of mountain lakes of Switzerland

External links

Golzerensee 
Seilbahngenossenschaft Golzern 

Lakes of Switzerland
Lakes of the canton of Uri